Mount Hope is an unincorporated community in Lawrence County, Alabama, United States. Its ZIP code is 35651.

Demographics

Mount Hope appeared on the 1880 U.S. Census as an unincorporated community of 94 residents. This was the only time it appeared on census rolls.

1985 School Fire

In 1985, Mount Hope High School was burned down, forcing students to watch the school burn down helplessly; most of the students were woken up from their sleep to watch their school burn down in the dark of midnight. Classes were temporarily held in the current Mount Hope School, which is deteriorating due to the nearby Hatton School System and Tharptown School Systems; the high school was never reconstructed. 
The town was again demolished by the  Hackleburg-Phil Campbell tornado of 2011. The tornado was at EF5 intensity as it struck Mount Hope.

Notable person
Mount Hope was the birthplace of Russell McWhortor Cunningham, acting governor of Alabama from 1904–1905.

Notes

Unincorporated communities in Lawrence County, Alabama
Unincorporated communities in Alabama